Tephritis posis is a species of tephritid or fruit flies in the genus Tephritis of the family Tephritidae.

Distribution
Europe, Ukraine, Southwest Russia.

References

Tephritinae
Insects described in 1939
Diptera of Europe